

History
Though the MIAC has been playing ice hockey since the 1920s, the league did not play a conference tournament until 1986. The championship served as a capstone for the MIAC season and was used as a final argument for a bid to the Division III NCAA Tournament. Despite not possessing an automatic bid the MIAC tournament champion was selected for the National Tournament each year. For the first four seasons the tournament had all rounds played as two-game total-goal series but changed to single-elimination for all round beginning with the 1990 tournament. Five years later the format was again changed, this time to a two-game point system where the first team to three points would win; one point was awarded for a tie and two points for a win. If the two teams were tied after two games than a 20-minute mini-game was played to determine the winner. By NCAA regulations mini-games were not counted in the standings and were only used to determine which team advanced. In 2000 the MIAC was among the conferences to receive the first automatic bids into the D-III championship, formalizing a practice that had already been in place. The 2021 tournament was cancelled due to the COVID-19 pandemic.

1986

Note: * denotes overtime period(s)

1987

Note: * denotes overtime period(s)

1988

Note: * denotes overtime period(s)

1989

Note: * denotes overtime period(s)

1990

Note: * denotes overtime period(s)

1991

Note: * denotes overtime period(s)

1992

Note: * denotes overtime period(s)

1993

Note: * denotes overtime period(s)

1994

Note: * denotes overtime period(s)

1995

Note: * denotes overtime period(s)Note: Mini-games in italics

1996

Note: * denotes overtime period(s)Note: Mini-games in italics

1997

Note: * denotes overtime period(s)Note: Mini-games in italics

1998

Note: * denotes overtime period(s)Note: Mini-games in italics

1999

Note: * denotes overtime period(s)Note: Mini-games in italics

2000

Note: * denotes overtime period(s)Note: Mini-games in italics

2001

Note: * denotes overtime period(s)Note: Mini-games in italics

2002

Note: * denotes overtime period(s)

2003

Note: * denotes overtime period(s)

2004

Note: * denotes overtime period(s)

2005

Note: * denotes overtime period(s)

2006

Note: * denotes overtime period(s)

2007

Note: * denotes overtime period(s)

2008

Note: * denotes overtime period(s)

2009

Note: * denotes overtime period(s)

2010

Note: * denotes overtime period(s)

2011

Note: * denotes overtime period(s)

2012

Note: * denotes overtime period(s)

2013

Note: * denotes overtime period(s)

2014

Note: * denotes overtime period(s)

2015

Note: * denotes overtime period(s)The semifinal between Saint Mary's and Concordia was rescheduled from February 28 to March 1

2016

Note: * denotes overtime period(s)

2017

Note: * denotes overtime period(s)

2018

Note: * denotes overtime period(s)

2019

Note: * denotes overtime period(s)

2020

Note: * denotes overtime period(s)

2022

Note: * denotes overtime period(s)

2023

Note: * denotes overtime period(s)

Championships

References

External links

Ice hockey
Minnesota Intercollegiate Athletic Conference
Recurring sporting events established in 1986